Full Sail is a second album by the progressive bluegrass band Chesapeake. The band combines folk, pop and country music on this album and most of the tracks include also drums, played by Pat McInerney.

Track listing

 "Home from the Mills" (Paul Mellyn) 2:47
 "Are You Tired of Me, My Darling?" (A.P. Carter) 3:28
 "Sweet Melinda" (Steve Gillette) 2:30
 "Rain and Snow" (Traditional) 3:00
 "Last Train from Poor Valley" (Norman Blake) 4:57
 "One Way Track" (Wes Golding, Ricky Skaggs) 3:00
 "The Lights of Home" (Randy Barrett, Béla Fleck) 4:06
 "Let It Roll" (Paul Barrere, Bill Payne, Martin Kibbee) 4:33
 "The Last Thing on My Mind" (Tom Paxton) 3:00
 "Free at Heart" (Tim O'Brien) 3:13
 "Crawfishin'" (J. Emerson, W.B. Emerson) 5:04

Personnel
 Moondi Klein - lead vocals, guitar, piano
 Mike Auldridge - Dobro, lap steel, pedal steel, guitar, vocals
 Jimmy Gaudreau - mandolin, guitar, vocals
 T. Michael Coleman - bass guitar, guitar, vocals

with
 Pat McInerney - percussion, drums

References

1996 albums
Sugar Hill Records albums